The 2014 season was the Denver Broncos' 45th in the National Football League (NFL) and their 55th overall. It also marked the third season with Peyton Manning as the team's starting quarterback.

The Broncos entered the 2014 season as the defending AFC champions, hoping to compete for another Super Bowl run, following a 43–8 loss to the Seattle Seahawks in Super Bowl XLVIII. The offseason was dominated by numerous roster changes, including the retirement of longtime cornerback Champ Bailey. One day before the start of the team's training camp, the Broncos announced that owner Pat Bowlen relinquished control of the team due to his battle with Alzheimer's disease.

Like the previous two seasons, the Broncos set numerous individual, league and franchise records, including wide receiver Demaryius Thomas setting a new franchise record for receiving yards in a single season, despite the team's offensive philosophy changing toward a run-oriented offense in the second half of the season. Manning threw a total of 40 touchdown passes, but only four came in the last four games of the regular season and the playoffs. In addition, Manning achieved only one 300-yard passing game within the team's last seven games (including the playoffs), courtesy of the emergence of running back C. J. Anderson, who achieved 1,282 all-purpose yards, the majority of which came in the second half of the regular season and the playoffs. One day after the Broncos' 24–13 playoff loss to the Indianapolis Colts in the Divisional round of the playoffs, media reports indicated that Manning had been playing with a strained quadriceps since a Week 15 game against the San Diego Chargers.

The Broncos clinched their fourth consecutive AFC West division title, a first-round bye and the AFC's No. 2 seed, but lost in the Divisional round of the playoffs for the third time in four seasons.

This was also John Fox's final year as the Broncos' head coach after four seasons, as he mutually agreed to part ways with the team on January 12, 2015, possibly due to poor playoff performances during his tenure, including no playoff wins in 2012 and 2014, as well as suffering a blowout loss in Super Bowl XLVIII.

Coaching and front-office changes
 March 11: James Cregg was hired as the team's offensive line assistant coach, while Bo Hardegree was hired as the offensive quality control coach. The team also announced that offensive line consultant Alex Gibbs will not return to the team.
 July 21: The Broncos announced that Adam Peters will replace Lenny McGill as the team's assistant director of college scouting. McGill will now serve as a southwest area scout. Additionally, John Spytek, the team's director of college scouting, will become a national scout.

Owner Pat Bowlen steps down
On July 23, one day before the start of the Broncos' training camp, owner Pat Bowlen relinquished control of the team due to his battle with Alzheimer's disease. Bowlen, who has served as the team's owner since 1984, had been privately battling the disease since 2009 after experiencing short-term memory loss, and had since taken a reduced role with the team, resulting in team president Joe Ellis and executive vice president/general manager John Elway making team decisions. Ellis and Elway assumed full control of the team, though Bowlen's long-term plan is for one of his seven children to run the team in the future, preventing a sale of the team.

Roster changes

Free agents

Signings

Departures

Trades
On August 26, the Broncos acquired placekicker Brandon McManus in a trade that sent a conditional 2015 seventh-round draft selection to the New York Giants; the trade became official on October 3 when original placekicker Matt Prater was released three days before his four-game suspension for violating the league's substance-abuse policy would have ended. However, McManus was waived on November 25 due to his inconsistency (9-of-13 on field goal attempts), and replaced by former Tampa Bay Buccaneers' placekicker Connor Barth. McManus was later re-signed to the Broncos' practice squad on December 4 due to concerns regarding Barth's kickoff lengths. Two days later (December 6), McManus was promoted to the active roster.

Draft

Draft trades

Undrafted free agents

All undrafted free agents were signed after the 2014 NFL draft concluded on May 10, unless noted otherwise.

Suspensions

Matt Prater

On August 23, placekicker Matt Prater was suspended for the first four games of the season for violating the league's substance-abuse policy. Prater had been charged with drunk driving on two previous occasions – January 2008 in Orlando, Florida, and August 2011 in Denver, Colorado. Following the latter transgression, Prater was placed in the league's alcohol program, and Prater acknowledged that he consumed three beers while on vacation during the off-season – a violation of the league's alcohol program. The NFL initially threatened a one-year suspension, but with the aid of Prater's attorney, Harvey Steinberg, his suspension was negotiated to four games. Undrafted rookie Mitch Ewald was expected to fill in placekicker duties while Prater served his suspension, however, on August 26, Ewald was waived and the Broncos acquired Brandon McManus in a trade that sent a 2015 seventh-round draft selection to the New York Giants. The trade was contingent upon McManus remaining on the Broncos' active roster after the end of Prater's suspension. On October 3, the Broncos decided to stick with McManus and released Prater three days before his suspension would have ended. On October 7, Prater signed with the Detroit Lions.

Wes Welker

On September 2, wide receiver Wes Welker was initially suspended for the first four games of the season for testing positive for the amphetamine Adderall, a violation of the league's substance-abuse policy. Welker denied reports that he took MDMA (also known as "Molly") that had been laced with amphetamines, while attending a Kentucky Derby race during the off-season. However, on September 17, after missing the first two games of the season, Welker's suspension was overturned after the NFL and the NFL Player's Association came to an agreement on a new drug policy. Under the revised policy, Welker's violation places him on a probationary period for first-time violators.

Injuries

 August 28: Undrafted rookie defensive end Kenny Anunike injured his elbow during the team's final preseason game against the Dallas Cowboys, and was placed on injured reserve two days later (August 30).
 September 14: Linebacker Lerentee McCray missed three games after suffering a sprained knee ligament during the team's Week 2 win over the Kansas City Chiefs.
 November 2: Linebacker Nate Irving suffered a serious knee injury during the Broncos' Week 9 loss to the New England Patriots. An MRI test on November 3 determined that Irving suffered ligament damage, and the team placed him on the season-ending injured reserve ten days later (November 13).
 November 9: Running back Ronnie Hillman suffered a sprained foot during the Broncos' Week 10 win over the Oakland Raiders, and missed the team's next six games.
 November 16: Tight end Julius Thomas suffered a sprained ankle during the Broncos' Week 11 loss to the St. Louis Rams, and missed the team's next three games.
 November 23: Cornerback Aqib Talib suffered a strained hamstring during the Broncos' Week 12 win over the Miami Dolphins, and missed the team's Week 13 win over the Kansas City Chiefs.
 December 13: Safety Quinton Carter was placed on injured reserve, after experiencing pain in his knee. Carter played in 11 of the team's first 12 games this season, after missing the 2012 and 2013 seasons with a knee injury.
 December 14: Linebacker Brandon Marshall suffered a Lisfranc sprain in his right foot during the team's Week 15 win over the San Diego Chargers, and missed the Broncos last two regular season games, but returned for the team's Divisional playoff game vs. the Indianapolis Colts on January 11, 2015.
 December 23: Safety T. J. Ward suffered a sprained neck during the team's Week 16 loss to the Cincinnati Bengals, and missed the Week 17 regular season finale against the Oakland Raiders.
 January 10: Defensive end Quanterus Smith was placed on Injured reserve due to a knee injury, one day prior to the Broncos' Divisional playoff game vs. the Indianapolis Colts.

Montee Ball
Running back Montee Ball was twice sidelined with a groin injury. On October 5, Ball suffered a strained groin during the team's Week 5 win over the Arizona Cardinals, and missed the team's next five games. On November 16, during the Broncos' Week 11 loss to the St. Louis Rams, Ball re-aggravated the injury, and was placed on injured reserve on December 13.

Danny Trevathan
Linebacker Danny Trevathan was sidelined with injuries to his left kneecap on three different occasions. On August 12, prior to the Broncos' second preseason game, Trevathan suffered a fractured left kneecap during practice, and missed the first three games of the regular season. On October 12, during the Broncos' Week 6 win over the New York Jets, Trevathan suffered the same injury to his left knee. Two days later (October 14), Trevathan was placed on the injured reserve list with a designation to return, in which he missed eight weeks, and was moved to the active roster on December 13, one day before the team's Week 15 game against the San Diego Chargers. However, Trevathan suffered a dislocation of his kneecap during the team's Week 15 win over the Chargers, and was placed on the season-ending injured reserve on December 16.

Staff

Final roster

Preseason

Regular season

Schedule

Note: Intra-division opponents are in bold text.

Game summaries

Week 1: vs. Indianapolis Colts

The Broncos kicked off their  season against the Indianapolis Colts on NBC's Sunday Night Football. A 21-yard field goal by Broncos' placekicker Brandon McManus was the only scoring play of the first quarter. In the second quarter, the Broncos increased their lead to 24–0, with quarterback Peyton Manning throwing three touchdown passes to tight end Julius Thomas – a 3-yarder, a 35-yarder and a 5-yarder. The Colts got on the scoreboard just before halftime, with quarterback Andrew Luck rushing for a 9-yard touchdown. On the Colts' first offensive possession of the second half, the Broncos' defense made a goal-line stand, as linebacker Brandon Marshall snuffed out Luck's attempt of a quarterback sneak on 4th-and-goal. Colts' placekicker Adam Vinatieri added a 25-yard field goal later in the third quarter. The Broncos increased their lead to 31–10 with 9:54 remaining in the fourth quarter, with running back Montee Ball rushing for a 3-yard touchdown. The Colts responded on their next possession, with Luck connecting on a 41-yard touchdown pass to wide receiver Dwayne Allen to pull within 31–17 midway through the fourth quarter. The Colts subsequently recovered an onside kick, however, eight plays later, Luck was intercepted by Broncos' safety Rahim Moore deep in Broncos' territory. The Broncos' offense forced the Colts to burn two of their three team timeouts on their next possession, but went three-and-out. The Colts pulled to within 31–24 with 3:32 remaining in the game, with Luck throwing a 9-yard touchdown pass to wide receiver Hakeem Nicks. The Broncos' offense subsequently went three-and-out on their next possession, and were forced to punt with three minutes left in the game. The Colts attempted a rally, however, Broncos' cornerback Bradley Roby broke up a 4th-down pass from Luck that was intended for wide receiver Reggie Wayne on the first play after the two-minute warning. The Broncos' offense subsequently ran out the clock.

Week 2: vs. Kansas City Chiefs

Coming off their season-opening win over the Colts, the Broncos remained on home ground for an AFC West duel against the Kansas City Chiefs. The Broncos grabbed the lead on the game's opening drive, with quarterback Peyton Manning throwing a 4-yard touchdown pass to tight end Julius Thomas. The Chiefs got on the scoreboard later in the first quarter, with a 45-yard field goal by placekicker Cairo Santos, then took the lead early in the second quarter, with a 2-yard touchdown run by running back Knile Davis. The Broncos re-claimed the lead on their next offensive possession, with Manning connecting on a 4-yard touchdown pass to tight end Jacob Tamme, then added to their lead just before halftime, with a 12-yard touchdown pass from Manning to wide receiver Demaryius Thomas.

The Chiefs got the opening possession of the second half, with a time-consuming drive that took them to as far as the Broncos' 4-yard line, but were backed up 10 yards by an offensive holding penalty and a 5-yard sack of quarterback Alex Smith by Broncos' linebacker Brandon Marshall. Santos subsequently missed a 37-yard field goal to end a drive that chewed up the first 10 minutes of the third quarter. The Broncos were forced to punt on their next possession, and the Chiefs narrowed the Broncos' lead to 21–17 midway through the fourth quarter with another time-consuming drive, culminating with a 4-yard touchdown run by Davis. The Broncos drove down the field on their next possession, but had to settle on a 20-yard field by placekicker Brandon McManus to extend their lead to 24–17 with 3:30 remaining in the fourth quarter.

Three plays into the Chiefs' next possession, Smith was intercepted by Broncos' cornerback Aqib Talib, who returned the football 41 yards for a touchdown; however, the interception return was nullified by an offside penalty on defensive end Quanterus Smith. The Chiefs' earned one first down prior to the two-minute warning. On the second play after the two-minute warning, Broncos' defensive end DeMarcus Ware forced a fumble off Smith; however, it was ruled an incomplete pass following a replay review. On the next play, Smith connected on a 21-yard pass to wide receiver Dwayne Bowe, and was pushed out of bounds at the Broncos' 9-yard line by cornerback Chris Harris, Jr. with 1:51 remaining in the game. Three plays later, after burning their last timeout, the Chiefs were facing a 3rd-and-goal at the Broncos' 4-yard line; however, an offside call against Ware moved the ball half the distance to the goal line, with 1:04 remaining in the game. Davis subsequently attempted a run up the middle, but was tackled for no gain at the 2-yard line by Ware and linebacker Nate Irving. On the Chiefs' final offensive play, Smith's pass intended for Bowe on 4th-and-goal was broken up by Broncos' defensive tackle Terrance Knighton. Manning subsequently kneeled down to run out the clock.

Notes

During halftime, the Broncos made three additions to their Ring of Fame: Gene Mingo, who played multiple positions with the Broncos from 1960 to 1964; Dan Reeves, who coached the Broncos from 1981 to 1992 and led the team to three Super Bowl appearances in 1986, 1987 and 1989; wide receiver Rick Upchurch, who played with the Broncos from 1975 to 1983.

Week 3: at Seattle Seahawks

Coming off back-to-back home wins to start the season, the Broncos traveled to CenturyLink Field for an interconference duel against the Seattle Seahawks, hoping to avenge their 43–8 blowout loss to the Seahawks in Super Bowl XLVIII. On the Broncos' first possession, Seahawks' safety Kam Chancellor forced a fumble off running back Montee Ball deep in Broncos' territory. The ensuing Seahawks' drive culminated in placekicker Steven Hauschka settling for a 20-yard field goal. The Broncos drove down the field on their next possession, but had to settle for a 24-yard field goal by placekicker Brandon McManus. Both teams traded punts on their next two possessions, until the Seahawks re-claimed the lead late in the second quarter, with a 39-yard touchdown pass from quarterback Russell Wilson to wide receiver Ricardo Lockette, then added to their lead with a 5-yard touchdown pass from Wilson to running back Marshawn Lynch just before halftime.

After a scoreless third quarter, which included Broncos' defensive tackle Terrance Knighton blocking a 46-yard field goal attempt by Hauschka, Britton Colquitt sent a punt that backed up the Seahawks to their own 8-yard line to begin the fourth quarter. Three plays later, Lynch was tackled in the end zone by linebacker Nate Irving and cornerback Aqib Talib for a Broncos' safety to narrow the Seahawks' lead to 17–5. The Broncos were forced to punt on their first possession of the fourth quarter, and on the Seahawks' next possession, Wilson was intercepted by cornerback Chris Harris, Jr., who advanced the football to the Seahawks' 19-yard line. Five plays later, the Broncos' offense finally got into the end zone, with quarterback Peyton Manning connecting on a 3-yard touchdown pass to tight end Julius Thomas. The Seahawks were forced to punt on their next possession, and the Broncos' offense got the football with 6:07 remaining in the fourth quarter. On the ninth play of the drive, the Broncos were facing a 3rd-and-11 at the Seahawks' 24-yard line, however, a Manning pass intended for wide receiver Wes Welker was intercepted by Chancellor, who advance all the way to the Broncos' 35-yard line. Five plays later, Hauschka made a 28-yard field goal to increase the Seahawks' lead to 20–12, with 1:04 remaining in the fourth quarter.

With no timeouts remaining, Manning engineered an 80-yard drive in only 35 seconds, which included two key pass completions – a 42-yarder to wide receiver Emmanuel Sanders and a 12-yarder to wide receiver Demaryius Thomas. On the sixth play of the drive, Manning completed a 26-yard touchdown pass to tight end Jacob Tamme, coupled with a two-point conversion pass from Manning to wide receiver Demaryius Thomas to send the game into overtime, tied at 20–20. However, the Seahawks won the overtime coin toss, and methodically marched down the field with a 13-play, 80-yard drive, culminating in a game-winning 6-yard touchdown run by Lynch to end the game.

Week 5: vs. Arizona Cardinals

Coming off their loss to the Seahawks and subsequent bye week, the Broncos returned home for an interconference duel against the Arizona Cardinals. The Cardinals grabbed the early lead, with a 33-yard field goal by placekicker Chandler Catanzaro. The Broncos then claimed the lead, with quarterback Peyton Manning throwing his 500th career touchdown pass – a 7-yarder to tight end Julius Thomas. Another field goal by Catanzaro – from 48 yards out, narrowed the Broncos' lead to 7–6. The Broncos expanded their lead midway through the second quarter, with Manning connecting on a 31-yard touchdown pass to wide receiver Demaryius Thomas. On the Broncos' next possession, Manning was intercepted by Cardinals' defensive end Calais Campbell deep in Broncos' territory. The Cardinals' offense capitalized on the next play, with a 5-yard touchdown run by running back Andre Ellington. After the two teams traded punts, Manning threw another touchdown pass to Demaryius Thomas – an 86-yarder just after the two-minute warning. The Broncos added to their lead in the third quarter, with a 44-yard field goal by placekicker Brandon McManus. Cardinals' quarterback Drew Stanton, playing in place of an injured Carson Palmer, was knocked out of the game with a concussion by Broncos' linebacker Von Miller. Later in the third quarter, third-string quarterback Logan Thomas threw an 81-yard touchdown pass to Ellington to narrow the Broncos' lead to 24–20. However, in the fourth quarter, the Broncos pulled away from the Cardinals and scored the final 17 points of the game, with a 41-yard field goal by McManus, a 12-yard touchdown pass from Manning to Julius Thomas and an 8-yard touchdown run by running back Juwan Thompson.

Notes

The Broncos improved their all-time series record against the Cardinals to 8–1–1, and remained unbeaten in home games against the Cardinals (5–0).

Week 6: at New York Jets

Coming off their win over the Cardinals, the Broncos flew to East Rutherford, New Jersey, for an AFC match against the New York Jets at MetLife Stadium. A 37-yard field goal by placekicker Brandon McManus gave the Broncos the lead on the game's opening possession. The Jets grabbed the lead on their second possession, with a 2-yard touchdown pass from quarterback Geno Smith to tight end Jace Amaro. The Broncos were forced to punt on their next four offensive possessions, but re-claimed the lead in the second quarter, with quarterback Peyton Manning throwing a pair of touchdown passes – a 1-yarder to wide receiver Demaryius Thomas, followed by a 22-yarder to tight end Julius Thomas just before halftime. The Broncos added to their lead on their first possession of the third quarter, with Manning connecting on another touchdown pass to Julius Thomas – from 4 yards out. However, the Jets later cut into the Broncos' lead, with a 30-yard field goal by placekicker Nick Folk, followed in the fourth quarter by a 2-yard touchdown pass from Smith to wide receiver Eric Decker, to narrow the Broncos' lead to 24–17 with eight minutes remaining in the game. Both teams went three-and-out on their next offensive possessions. The Broncos' offense got the football with 5:05 remaining in the game, and forced the Jets to burn all of their team timeouts just after the two-minute warning, but failed to convert on a critical third-down pass with 1:07 remaining in the game, forcing a punt. The Jets had one last possession deep in their own territory, however, on the third play, Smith was intercepted by Broncos' cornerback Aqib Talib, who ran 22 yards into the end zone for the game-clinching touchdown.

Week 7: vs. San Francisco 49ers

Coming off their win over the Jets, the Broncos returned home for an interconference duel against the San Francisco 49ers. The Broncos jumped out to a 14–0 lead in the first quarter, with quarterback Peyton Manning throwing a pair of touchdown passes – a 3-yarder to wide receiver Emmanuel Sanders and a 39-yarder to wide receiver Wes Welker. The 49ers got on the scoreboard midway through the second quarter, with a 22-yard field goal by placekicker Phil Dawson. On the Broncos' next possession, Manning became the NFL's all-time leader in career touchdown passes, with an 8-yard touchdown pass to wide receiver Demaryius Thomas. The 49ers responded just before halftime, with a 4-yard touchdown pass from quarterback Colin Kaepernick to wide receiver Stevie Johnson, which narrowed the Broncos' lead to 21–10. On the 49ers' first offensive possession of the second half, Kaepernick was intercepted by Broncos' cornerback Aqib Talib. The Broncos subsequently took control of the game with 21 unanswered points, consisting of a 40-yard touchdown pass from Manning to Demaryius Thomas, followed by a pair of rushing touchdown by running back Ronnie Hillman – a 37-yarder and a 1-yarder. With the Broncos comfortably ahead, Manning sat out the entire fourth quarter, and backup quarterback Brock Osweiler took his place. The 49ers added a late score, with quarterback Blaine Gabbert, playing in place of Kaepernick, throwing a 20-yard touchdown pass to wide receiver Bruce Ellington.

Notes

This was the only game during the 2014 season in which the Broncos wore their alternate navy blue uniforms.

Week 8: vs. San Diego Chargers

Coming off their dominant win over the 49ers, the Broncos remained on home ground for an AFC West duel against the San Diego Chargers on Thursday Night Football. After a scoreless first quarter, a 2-yard touchdown pass from quarterback Peyton Manning to wide receiver Emmanuel Sanders gave the Broncos the lead early in the second quarter. After the two teams traded punts on their next possessions, the Chargers tied the game with a time-consuming drive, culminating with 2-yard touchdown pass from quarterback Philip Rivers to wide receiver Keenan Allen. On the ensuing kickoff, Chargers' linebacker Kavell Conner forced a fumble off Broncos' return specialist Andre Caldwell, and it was recovered by Chargers' tight end Ladarius Green deep in Broncos' territory. However, it was overturned after an instant replay review. The Broncos then re-claimed the lead just before halftime, with another touchdown pass from Manning to Sanders – from 31 yards out.

On the Chargers' opening possession of the second half, Rivers was intercepted by Broncos' cornerback Chris Harris, Jr., and six plays later, the Broncos added to their lead, with Manning throwing his third touchdown pass to Sanders – from 3 yards out. After the Broncos' defense forced a Chargers' punt, the Broncos increased their lead to 28–7 midway through the third quarter, with running back Juwan Thompson rushing for a 2-yard touchdown. The Chargers responded on their next possession, with a 4-yard touchdown pass from Rivers to tight end Antonio Gates on 4th-and-goal. The Broncos countered early in the fourth quarter, with Thompson rushing for a 1-yard touchdown. The drive was kept alive by a defensive holding penalty on Chargers' safety Marcus Gilchrist that negated an Eric Weddle interception of Manning near the goal line. The Chargers once again had a response, with another touchdown pass from Rivers to Gates – from 10 yards out. The Broncos tried to add to their lead on their next possession, however, placekicker Brandon McManus missed on a 53-yard field goal attempt. The Chargers attempted a rally, but Rivers was intercepted by Broncos' safety Rahim Moore near the goal line with five minutes remaining in the game. The Broncos' offense then ran out most of the clock, aided by a crucial 5-yard pass completion from Manning to wide receiver Wes Welker on 3rd-and-4 from their own 10-yard line that forced the Chargers to burn the last two of their three team timeouts, sealing the win for the Broncos.

Week 9: at New England Patriots

Coming off their win over the Chargers, the Broncos traveled to Foxborough, Massachusetts to face the New England Patriots at Gillette Stadium. The Patriots got on the scoreboard first, with a 49-yard field goal by placekicker Stephen Gostkowski. The Broncos grabbed the lead later in the first quarter, with running back Ronnie Hillman rushing for a 1-yard touchdown. However, the Patriots then reeled off 24 unanswered points. First came a 29-yard field goal by Gostkowski early in the second quarter. Then, on the second play of the Broncos' next possession, Patriots' defensive end Rob Ninkovich intercepted Broncos' quarterback Peyton Manning, and the Patriots capitalized five plays later, with a 5-yard touchdown pass from quarterback Tom Brady to wide receiver Julian Edelman. This was followed by Edelman returning a punt 84 yards for a touchdown and a 5-yard touchdown pass from Brady to running back Shane Vereen just before halftime. On the Patriots' first possession of the second half, Brady was intercepted by Broncos' cornerback Bradley Roby, and six plays later, Manning connected on an 18-yard touchdown pass to tight end Julius Thomas to narrow the gap to 27–14. However, the Patriots added to their lead, with a 45-yard field goal by Gostkowski, followed by a 10-yard touchdown pass from Brady to wide receiver Brandon LaFell. The latter score came after a Manning pass intended for wide receiver Wes Welker bounced off Welker and was intercepted by cornerback Brandon Browner. The Broncos attempted a rally, with Manning connecting on a 15-yard touchdown pass to Hillman. However, the Patriots put the game out of reach early in the fourth quarter, with a 1-yard touchdown pass from Brady to tight end Rob Gronkowski. The Broncos' offense drove deep into Patriots' territory on two of their next three possessions, but turned the football over on downs each time.

Notes

Tom Brady improved his head-to-head record against Peyton Manning to 11–5. This was the final regular season meeting between the two legendary quarterbacks; a foot injury kept Manning out of the teams' 2015 meeting, and the two quarterbacks met for the final time in the 2015 AFC Championship.

Week 10: at Oakland Raiders

Hoping to rebound from their loss to the Patriots, the Broncos flew to the O.co Coliseum for an AFC West duel with the Oakland Raiders. Each team traded field goals in the first quarter, with a 41-yard field goal by Raiders' placekicker Sebastian Janikowski and a 20-yarder by Broncos' placekicker Brandon McManus, the latter of whom added a 28-yard field goal early in the second quarter. The Raiders re-claimed the lead, with quarterback Derek Carr connecting on a 5-yard touchdown pass to wide receiver Brice Butler. However, the Broncos took control of the game with 35 unanswered points. Quarterback Peyton Manning shook off two early interceptions and connected on a pair of touchdown passes within the last three minutes of the first half – 51-yarder to running back C. J. Anderson and a 32-yarder to wide receiver Emmanuel Sanders. Manning added three more touchdown passes in the third quarter – a 10- and 12-yarder to tight end Julius Thomas, followed by a 15-yarder to Sanders. Two of the three third-quarter scoring plays came off Raiders' turnovers. Manning sat out the entire fourth quarter, and backup quarterback Brock Osweiler took his place. The Raiders added a late score, with Carr connecting on an 18-yard touchdown pass to tight end Mychal Rivera.

Week 11: at St. Louis Rams

Coming off their win over the Raiders, the Broncos traveled to the Edward Jones Dome for an interconference match against the St. Louis Rams. The Rams grabbed the early lead on their first possession, with a 29-yard field goal by placekicker Greg Zuerlein. The Broncos were forced to punt on their first offensive possession. On the Broncos' next possession, tight end Julius Thomas suffered an ankle injury and did not return to the game. On the tenth play of the drive, the Broncos opted to go for a first-down on a 4th-and-5 from the Rams' 37-yard line rather than attempt a long field goal, however, a pass from quarterback Peyton Manning to wide receiver Emmanuel Sanders fell incomplete. On the very next play, the Rams extended to a 10–0 lead, with quarterback Shaun Hill connecting on a 63-yard touchdown pass to wide receiver Kenny Britt, with Britt evading a tackle by Broncos' cornerback Bradley Roby. The Rams' defense held the Broncos' offense in check on their next two possessions, and with four minutes remaining in the second quarter, Zuerlein added a 29-yard field goal to give the Rams a 13–0 lead. The Broncos subsequently got on the scoreboard on their next possession, with a 42-yard touchdown pass from Manning to Sanders just before the two-minute warning.

On the fourth play of the Broncos' first possession of the second half, Sanders suffered a concussion after absorbing a helmet-to-helmet hit from Rams' safety Rodney McLeod, and did not return. However, after the 15-yard penalty, the Broncos could not advance the football from the Rams' 38-yard line, and were forced to punt. The Rams increased their lead to 16–7 later in their third quarter, with a 22-yard field goal by Zuerlein. On the Broncos' next possession, Manning was intercepted by Rams' linebacker Alec Ogletree, and seven plays later, a 55-yard field goal by Zuerlein increased the Rams' lead to 19–7 early in the fourth quarter. The Broncos advanced to as far as the Rams' 28-yard line on their next possession, and faced a 4th-and-4, however, Manning was sacked by Rams' defensive tackle Aaron Donald. The Broncos' defense subsequently forced a Rams' punt, however, Manning was intercepted by cornerback Trumaine Johnson on the Broncos' next possession. Four plays later, Zuerlein added a 53-yard field goal with 4:48 remaining in the game. With no timeouts remaining, the Broncos attempted a rally, but the Rams' defense stood their ground, and subsequently ran out most of the clock on offense.

Notes

The Broncos accumulated only 28 rushing yards. The Rams' defense held the Broncos to 4-of-12 on third down and 0-of-3 on fourth down. This was the Broncos' lowest point total since Peyton Manning became the teams' starting quarterback in 2012. With his 389-yard performance, Manning now has at least one 300-yard passing game against every NFL team. However, his streak of 15 consecutive games with multiple touchdown passes came to an end.

Week 12: vs. Miami Dolphins

Hoping to rebound from their loss to the Rams, the Broncos returned home for an AFC duel against the Miami Dolphins – the Broncos' first home game in exactly one month. The Dolphins grabbed the early lead, with running back Daniel Thomas rushing for a 3-yard touchdown. The Broncos subsequently got on the scoreboard, with a 38-yard field goal by placekicker Brandon McManus. The Dolphins added to their lead early in the second quarter, with quarterback Ryan Tannehill rushing for a 1-yard touchdown. The Broncos cut into the Dolphins' lead, with quarterback Peyton Manning connecting on a 5-yard touchdown pass to wide receiver Demaryius Thomas, however, the Dolphins responded, with Tannehill throwing a 10-yard touchdown pass to wide receiver Mike Wallace. Another touchdown pass from Manning to Demaryius Thomas – from 14 yards out – narrowed the Dolphins' lead to 21–17 just before halftime.

The Broncos drove to as far as the Dolphins' 7-yard line on the initial possession of the second half, but after Manning was sacked by Dolphins' linebacker Jelani Jenkins for an 8-yard loss, McManus missed on a 33-yard field goal attempt. After the Broncos' defense forced a Dolphins' punt, return specialist Isaiah Burse fumbled deep in Broncos' territory, giving the football back to the Dolphins. Four plays later, Tannehill connected with wide receiver Jarvis Landry on a 5-yard touchdown pass to give the Dolphins a 28–17 lead at the 2:15 mark of the third quarter. The Broncos then reeled off 22 unanswered points. Early in the fourth quarter, Manning threw his third touchdown pass of the game to Demaryius Thomas – from 5 yards out – coupled with a two-point conversion pass to wide receiver Emmanuel Sanders. After forcing a Dolphins' punt, the Broncos grabbed their first lead of the game at the 5:05 mark of the fourth quarter, with running back C. J. Anderson rushing for a 10-yard touchdown. On the third play of the Dolphins' next possession, Tannehill was intercepted by Broncos' safety T. J. Ward, who advanced the football all the way to the Dolphins' 8-yard line. Two plays later, Manning threw a 2-yard touchdown pass to wide receiver Wes Welker to increase the Broncos' lead to 39–28 with 3:17 remaining in the fourth quarter. The Dolphins attempted a rally, with Tannehill connecting on a 1-yard touchdown pass to Landry, coupled with running back Lamar Miller rushing for a two-point conversion, with 1:37 remaining in the game. However, the Dolphins' onside kick attempt was unsuccessful, and the Broncos subsequently ran out the clock.

Notes

Week 13: at Kansas City Chiefs

Coming off their come-from-behind win over the Dolphins, the Broncos traveled to Arrowhead Stadium for an AFC West rematch with the Kansas City Chiefs. The Broncos jumped out to a 14–0 lead on their first two possessions in the first quarter, with quarterback Peyton Manning throwing a pair of touchdown passes – a 23-yarder to wide receiver Demaryius Thomas and a 15-yarder to running back C. J. Anderson. A 22-yard field goal by placekicker Connor Barth increased the Broncos' lead to 17–0 early in the second quarter. The scoring play occurred after the Broncos' special teams fooled the Chiefs with a fake punt run by safety David Bruton and a fourth-down conversion by Anderson. The Chiefs got on the scoreboard later in the second quarter, with quarterback Alex Smith connecting on a 20-yard touchdown pass to tight end Anthony Fasano. The Broncos' offense subsequently marched down the field, but had to settle on a 24-yard field goal by Barth just before halftime. The Chiefs' defense forced a fumble off Manning deep in Broncos' territory on the Broncos' first possession of the second half, but had to settle on a 39-yard field goal by placekicker Cairo Santos. Barth added two more field goals – a 30-yarder midway through the third quarter and a 33-yarder early in the fourth quarter – to increase the Broncos' lead to 26–10. The first field goal came after a DeMarcus Ware interception of Smith on a deflected pass, while the second field goal came after Chiefs' cornerback Marcus Cooper muffed a punt. The Chiefs narrowed the Broncos' lead, with Smith throwing a 12-yard touchdown pass to running back Jamaal Charles. However, Broncos' safety T. J. Ward knocked away a two-point conversion pass from Smith intended for Fasano that would have brought the Chiefs to within a one-score deficit. Barth added one more field goal – a 37-yarder midway through the fourth quarter. The Broncos' defense subdued the Chiefs for the remainder of the game.

Notes

With the win, the Broncos swept the Chiefs for a third consecutive season. Peyton Manning improved his personal record to 11–1 all-time in games against the Chiefs.

Week 14: vs. Buffalo Bills

Coming off their win over the Chiefs, the Broncos returned home for an AFC match against the Buffalo Bills. A 6-yard touchdown run by Broncos' running back C. J. Anderson was the only scoring play of the first quarter. The Bills got on the scoreboard early in the second quarter, with a 44-yard field goal by placekicker Dan Carpenter. The Broncos later added to their lead, with Anderson rushing for two more touchdowns – a 1-yarder later in the second quarter, followed by a 3-yarder on the initial possession of the second half. On the Bills' first possession of the third quarter, quarterback Kyle Orton was intercepted by Broncos' linebacker Brandon Marshall at the Bills' 33-yard line. However, three plays later, Broncos' quarterback Peyton Manning was intercepted by Bills' cornerback Stephon Gilmore. The Bills subsequently marched to the Broncos' 19-yard line in eight plays, however, Orton was intercepted by Broncos' cornerback Chris Harris, Jr. near the goal line. Eight plays later, the Broncos extended their lead to 24–3 late in the third quarter, with a 50-yard field goal by placekicker Connor Barth. The Bills then narrowed the Broncos' lead, with a 13-play, 80-yard drive, culminating in a 14-yard touchdown pass from Orton to wide receiver Chris Hogan at the 10:52 mark of the fourth quarter. The Bills' defense forced the Broncos to punt on their next two possessions. Trailing 24–10 with 4:20 remaining in the game and no timeouts, the Bills attempted a rally, with Orton rushing for a 1-yard touchdown with 55 seconds remaining. However, the Bills' onside kick attempt was unsuccessful, and the Broncos subsequently ran out the clock.

Notes

Peyton Manning's streak of 51 consecutive games with at least one touchdown pass came to an end. Manning's streak is the third-longest in NFL history, behind Tom Brady (52) and Drew Brees (54).

Week 15: at San Diego Chargers

Coming off their win over the Bills, the Broncos traveled to Qualcomm Stadium for an AFC West rematch with the San Diego Chargers. On the Broncos' second offensive possession, the Broncos advanced to the Chargers' 1-yard line, but were forced to settle for a 19-yard field goal by placekicker Connor Barth. On the Chargers' next possession, defensive end Malik Jackson forced a fumble off Chargers' quarterback Philip Rivers, which was recovered by Broncos' linebacker Von Miller deep in Chargers' territory. However, the Broncos were forced to settle for another Barth field goal early in the second quarter – from 26 yards out. The Chargers then drove to the Broncos' 28-yard line in 14 plays, however, placekicker Nick Novak's 46-yard field goal attempt was blocked by Broncos' defensive tackle Derek Wolfe. The Broncos subsequently marched all the way to the Chargers' 1-yard line, but were once again forced to settle for another 19-yard field goal by Barth, after a 1-yard touchdown run by C. J. Anderson was overturned by an instant replay review just after the two-minute warning. Broncos' quarterback Peyton Manning, battling through flu-like symptoms, suffered a thigh injury while attempting to throw a block on the overturned touchdown run. Backup quarterback Brock Osweiler took over for Manning on the Broncos' next possession. Both teams were forced to punt on their next possessions, and following the Broncos' punt, Chargers' return specialist Eddie Royal ran to the Broncos' 17-yard line with 50 seconds left before halftime. However, the Chargers were forced to settle for a 30-yard field goal by Novak to pull to within 9–3 at halftime.

Both teams were forced to punt on their initial possessions of the second half, and on the Chargers' second possession, Novak missed on a 37-yard field goal attempt that hit the left upright. The Broncos added to their lead near the end of the third quarter, with Manning connecting on a 28-yard touchdown pass to wide receiver Demaryius Thomas – the Broncos' only touchdown of the game. However, the Chargers responded, with an 11-play, 80-yard drive, culminating in a 5-yard touchdown pass from Rivers to tight end Antonio Gates. The Broncos subsequently increased their lead to 19–10 with five minutes remaining in the game, with a 49-yard field goal by Barth. The Chargers attempted a rally, but Rivers was intercepted by Broncos' cornerback Aqib Talib at the Chargers' 34-yard line. Three plays later, after the Chargers had exhausted all three of their team timeouts, Barth kicked his fifth field goal of the game – from 44 yards out. The Chargers had one last offensive possession, however, Rivers was intercepted by Broncos' safety Rahim Moore near the goal line just before the two-minute warning to seal the victory for the Broncos.

Notes

With the win, the Broncos clinched their fourth consecutive AFC West division title, and swept their division rivals on the road for the fifth time in six seasons.

Week 16: at Cincinnati Bengals

Coming off their AFC West division-clinching win over the Chargers, the Broncos traveled to Paul Brown Stadium for an AFC duel against the Cincinnati Bengals on Monday Night Football. The Broncos grabbed the early lead, with cornerback Aqib Talib returning an interception off Bengals' quarterback Andy Dalton 33 yards for a touchdown. However, on the first play of the Bengals' third possession, running back Jeremy Hill reeled off an 85-yard touchdown run to tie the score. The Bengals claimed the lead in the second quarter, with a 37-yard field goal by placekicker Mike Nugent. On the Broncos' next possession, quarterback Peyton Manning was intercepted by Bengals' safety Reggie Nelson, and the Bengals capitalized, with Dalton connecting on a 2-yard touchdown pass to wide receiver Jermaine Gresham. A 49-yard field goal by Nugent with one minute remaining in the first half increased the Bengals' lead to 20–7. The Broncos had one last possession before halftime, however, placekicker Connor Barth missed on a 49-yard field goal attempt.

On the Broncos' initial possession of the second half, return specialist Omar Bolden returned the opening kickoff to the Bengals' 21-yard line. Four plays later, running back C. J. Anderson scored on a 1-yard touchdown run. However, the Bengals had a response, as Adam Jones advanced the ensuing kickoff to the Broncos' 27-yard line. Three plays later, Dalton threw a 22-yard touchdown pass to wide receiver Giovani Bernard. The Broncos then scored 14 unanswered points, with Manning throwing a pair of touchdown passes to wide receiver Emmanuel Sanders – from 4 and 5 yards out – to give the Broncos a 28–27 lead. The second scoring play came after Broncos' linebacker Von Miller forced a fumble off Hill just as the Bengals were attempting to add to their lead. Rain started to fall in the fourth quarter, and on the Broncos' first fourth quarter possession, Manning was intercepted by Jones deep in Broncos' territory, however, a 15-yard taunting penalty on Nelson pushed the Bengals out of field goal range. The Broncos were forced to punt on their next possession, and return specialist Brandon Tate advanced all the way to the Broncos' 9-yard line. The Broncos defense forced the Bengals to settle for a 23-yard field goal by Nugent to give the Bengals a 30–28 lead with 7:53 remaining in the game. The two teams traded punts on their next possessions, and the Broncos attempted a rally, however, Bengals' cornerback Dre Kirkpatrick returned an interception off Manning 30 yards for a touchdown. With the rain intensifying, the Broncos had one last possession, but Manning threw another interception to Kirkpatrick, this one deep in Bengals' territory – Manning's fourth interception of the game – to seal the victory for the Bengals.

Notes

This was Peyton Manning's first loss to the Bengals in nine career games.

Week 17: vs. Oakland Raiders

Hoping to rebound from their Monday night loss to the Bengals, the Broncos returned home for an AFC West rematch with the Oakland Raiders. A 49-yard field goal by placekicker Connor Barth and an 11-yard touchdown run by running back C. J. Anderson gave the Broncos a 10–0 lead in the first quarter. The Raiders got on the scoreboard, when defensive end Justin Tuck deflected a lateral by quarterback Peyton Manning that was intended for wide receiver Emmanuel Sanders, and cornerback Keith McGill recovered and ran 18 yards for a touchdown. The Broncos subsequently added to their lead, with a 1-yard touchdown run by Anderson early in the second quarter, followed by a 36-yard field goal by Barth just before halftime and Anderson scoring his third rushing touchdown of the game – a 25 yarder on the opening possession of the second half. A 1-yard touchdown pass from Raiders' quarterback Derek Carr to running back Jamize Olawale narrowed the Broncos' lead to 27–14 midway through the third quarter. However, the Broncos pulled away with 20 unanswered points. Barth added two more field goals – a 35-yarder followed in the fourth quarter by a 21-yarder. Later in the fourth quarter, linebacker Lerentee McCray forced a fumble off Carr, and cornerback Tony Carter recovered and ran 20 yards for a touchdown. With the Broncos comfortably ahead, Manning was replaced by backup quarterback Brock Osweiler, and Osweiler connected with tight end Virgil Green on a 1-yard touchdown pass to complete the scoring.

Notes

With the win, the Broncos finished the regular season at 12–4, tied with the New England Patriots for the AFC's best record. However, the Patriots earned the No. 1 seed based on their head-to-head win over the Broncos in Week 9. The Broncos went 8–0 at home for the first time since 2005, and for the sixth time in franchise history. The Broncos won their seventh consecutive game against the Raiders, tying their longest winning streak against the Raiders since 1997–2000.

Standings

Division

Conference

Postseason

Schedule

Game summaries

AFC Divisional Playoffs: vs. (4) Indianapolis Colts

Following a first-round bye, the Broncos began their run in the 2014–15 NFL playoffs at home by welcoming the Indianapolis Colts, in a re-match of their Week 1 meeting. Coming into the game, the Broncos were a perfect 8–0 at home during the regular season. The Broncos grabbed the early lead, with a 1-yard touchdown pass from quarterback Peyton Manning to wide receiver Demaryius Thomas, which was the only scoring play of the first quarter. After the two teams exchange punts, the Colts tied the game at the beginning of the second quarter, with running back Dan Herron rushing for a 6-yard touchdown. The Colts' defense forced a fumble off Manning on the Broncos' first possession of the second quarter, and the Colts capitalized, with quarterback Andrew Luck connecting on a 3-yard touchdown pass to wide receiver Dwayne Allen. Just after the two-minute warning, Luck was intercepted by Broncos' cornerback Bradley Roby, and a 45-yard field goal by placekicker Connor Barth pulled the Broncos to within a 14–10 deficit at halftime.

The Broncos' offense went three-and-out on the opening possession of the second half, and the Colts subsequently added to their lead, with an 11-play, 72-yard drive that chewed up over eight minutes, culminating in a 15-yard touchdown pass from Luck to wide receiver Hakeem Nicks. The Broncos were forced to punt on their next possession, and after Luck was intercepted by Broncos' safety Rahim Moore, the Broncos' marched down the field, but were forced to settle on a 41-yard field goal by Barth early in the fourth quarter. The drive was kept alive by a critical fourth-down conversion by running back C. J. Anderson. Both teams went three-and-out on their next possessions, and the Colts added to their lead, with another time-consuming drive that chewed up eight minutes off the clock, culminating in a 30-yard field goal by placekicker Adam Vinatieri with 4:11 remaining in the game. On the sixth play of the Broncos' next drive, the Broncos faced a 4th-and-8 at their own 46-yard line, however, a pass completion from Manning to Anderson fell one yard short of a first down, turning the football over on downs with 3:04 remaining in the game. The Broncos challenged the play, thinking that Anderson had achieved the necessary yardage needed for a first down before his knee went down, however, the ruling was upheld. The Colts' offense forced the Broncos to burn the remaining two of their three team timeouts before the two-minute warning. The Broncos had one final possession, and advanced to as far as the Colts' 23-yard line with nine seconds remaining in the game, but without any timeouts, the game ended.

Statistics

Team leaders

League rankings

Records and milestones
Numerous individual, franchise and league records and milestones were either tied, reached or broken during the season:

Team
 Week 9: The Broncos scored 21 points in their 43–21 loss to the New England Patriots. It was their 29th consecutive game scoring 20 or more points. At the time, it surpassed an NFL record that was previously set by the St. Louis Rams in the 1999 and 2000 seasons, until the Baltimore Ravens surpassed that record in 2020.
 Week 15: The Broncos' 22–10 win over the San Diego Chargers was their 12th consecutive divisional road win, tying an NFL record that the San Francisco 49ers set from 1987 to 1990; John Fox became only the second head coach in NFL history to win four division titles in the first four seasons with a team, joining Chuck Knox.
 2014 season: The Broncos set a new franchise record for players selected to the Pro Bowl, with 11.

Peyton Manning

 Week 1: With the Broncos' win over the Indianapolis Colts, for whom he played from 1998 to 2010, Peyton Manning became only the second quarterback in NFL history to have defeated all 32 NFL teams, the other one being Brett Favre.
 Week 3: Threw his 100th touchdown pass in his 35th game as a Bronco, becoming the fastest quarterback in NFL history to achieve that feat with a single team, shattering Dan Marino's previous record of 44 games.
 Week 5: Became the second quarterback in NFL history to achieve 500 career touchdown passes, joining Brett Favre; set a new career high for passing yards in a single game, with 479.
 Week 7: Surpassed Craig Morton (11,895) for second-place on the Broncos' all-time list for passing yardage (11,984), behind John Elway (51,475).
 Week 9: Set a new NFL record with his 14th consecutive multi-touchdown passing game.
 2014 season: Manning was selected to his 14th Pro Bowl, tying Tony Gonzalez and Bruce Matthews for the most Pro Bowl selections in NFL history.

Other players

 Connor Barth: During wins over the Kansas City Chiefs in Week 13 and San Diego Chargers in Week 15, Barth kicked five field goals in each game, which, at the time, tied a franchise record for field goals in a single game. Brandon McManus surpassed that record with a six-field goal performance in 2020.
 Demaryius Thomas:
 Week 5: Set a new franchise record for receiving yards in a single game, with 226, surpassing the previous record of 214 that Shannon Sharpe set in 2002.
 Week 9: Set a new franchise record with his fifth consecutive 100-yard receiving game.
 Week 15: Tied a single-season franchise record with his eighth 100-yard receiving game, which Rod Smith previously set in the 2000 season.
 Week 16: Set a new franchise record for 100-yard receiving games in a single season; became only the third wide receiver in NFL history to achieve three consecutive seasons of at least 1,400 yards and 10 touchdown catches – the other two are Marvin Harrison and Jerry Rice.
 Week 17: Set a new franchise record for receiving yards in a single season, with 1,619, surpassing the previous record of 1,602 that Rod Smith set in the 2000 season. Thomas also finished with 111 receptions, two shy of the franchise record that Rod Smith set in 2000.
 Julius Thomas:
 Week 9: Became the first tight end in franchise history to achieve double-digit touchdowns in back-to-back seasons.
 Wes Welker: During the Broncos' Week 5 win over the Arizona Cardinals, Welker became the NFL's all-time leader in career pass receptions amongst undrafted wide receivers, surpassing former Broncos' wide receiver Rod Smith.

Awards and honors

Pro Bowl and All-Pro selections
On December 23, 2014, an NFL-high nine Broncos were selected to the 2015 Pro Bowl: Offensive tackle Ryan Clady, cornerbacks Chris Harris, Jr. and Aqib Talib, quarterback Peyton Manning, linebacker Von Miller, wide receiver Demaryius Thomas, tight end Julius Thomas, safety T. J. Ward and defensive end DeMarcus Ware. Wide receiver Emmanuel Sanders and running back C. J. Anderson were later added to the Pro Bowl roster as injury replacements – Sanders on January 15, 2015 and Anderson on January 19, 2015. Manning withdrew from the Pro Bowl due to the quad injury that he suffered during a Week 15 game vs. the San Diego Chargers and played through during the playoff loss to the Indianapolis Colts. Harris, Miller and Demaryius Thomas were also voted to the  All-Pro Second Team.

Other news and notes
 On February 12, 2014, John Elway, the team's Executive Vice-president of Football Operations since 2011, received a three-year contract extension from the Broncos that will run through the 2017 season. That same day, Elway was also officially given the title of general manager.
 On May 1, the Broncos exercised a fifth-year option on the contract of linebacker Von Miller, which would pay him a $9.75 million salary for the  season. Miller served a six-game suspension in 2013 for violating the NFL's substance-abuse policy and suffered a late-season knee injury that caused him to miss the playoffs.
 On May 24, the Broncos announced that Matt Russell, the team's director of player personnel since 2012, was sentenced to seven months in jail as the punishment for a July 2013 drunk driving incident in Summit County, Colorado, in which Russell collided with a police vehicle, resulting in an injury to a Breckenridge police officer. Russell also plead guilty to careless driving and possession of an open container of alcohol, and he is eligible to participate in a work release program that could allow him to participate in team travel assignments. On July 21, Russell began a 6  month work release sentence in an Arapahoe County jail, which is a very short distance from the Broncos' Dove Valley headquarters.
 On November 18, longtime cornerback Champ Bailey, who played with the Broncos from 2004 to 2013, signed a one-day contract with the team in order to officially retire as a Bronco.
 On December 12, the Broncos and cornerback Chris Harris, Jr. agreed on a five-year, $42.5 million contract extension that will run through the 2019 season.
 The Broncos set a new franchise record for regular season home attendance, with 615,517 fans.

References

External links

The Denver Post – Complete Broncos Coverage
2014 Season page on Pro Football Reference
NFL Nation Blog – ESPN

Denver
Denver Broncos seasons
Denver Broncos
AFC West championship seasons